Hrčeľ is a village and municipality in the Trebišov District in the Košice Region of south-eastern Slovakia.

History
In historical records the village was first mentioned in 1332.

Geography
The village lies at an altitude of 135 metres and covers an area of 9.9 km².
It has a population of about 790 people.

Ethnicity
The village is about 85% Slovak and 15% Gypsy.

Facilities
The village has a public library and a football pitch.

Genealogical resources

The records for genealogical research are available at the state archive "Statny Archiv in Kosice, Slovakia"

 Roman Catholic church records (births/marriages/deaths): 1755-1917 (parish B)
 Greek Catholic church records (births/marriages/deaths): 1788-1896 (parish B)
 Reformated church records (births/marriages/deaths): 1759-1910 (parish A)

See also
 List of municipalities and towns in Slovakia

External links
https://web.archive.org/web/20071217080336/http://www.statistics.sk/mosmis/eng/run.html
Surnames of living people in Hrcel

Villages and municipalities in Trebišov District
Zemplín (region)